is a Japanese manga series by Meme Higashiya. It follows the lives of two siblings: Atsushi, an elementary school boy with the appearance of an adult, and Atsumi, a high school girl with the appearance of a young child. An anime adaptation by Seven aired from January 5, 2012, to June 27, 2012, with another season airing in July 2013.

Characters

A fifth grade elementary school boy who has the appearance of a fully grown adult but still acts his age. His appearance often gets him into trouble with the police, particularly when he hangs around his classmate Hina, who he has a crush on and is going out with.

Atsushi's older sister who is in high school, but is short and has the appearance of a young girl. She is very responsible, but is quite reliant on Atsushi's height.

Atsumi's classmate and friend, who develops a crush on Atsushi despite later discovering that he is actually a grade schooler.  She could see Hina as a future rival for Atsushi.

Atsushi's elementary school teacher. Having previously taught at an all-girls school, she is not good with dealing with men, particularly Atsushi. Despite this, she has been shown to retrieve him from the police when he gets taken in.

Atsushi's classmate, who is good friends with him, the sight of which sets off alarms for onlookers getting the wrong idea.  She is going out with Atsushi.

Atsushi and Atsumi's next door neighbor whose face is never seen. He is in his early 30s and is constantly quitting his jobs, resulting in constant unemployment.
Miura

A policewoman who knows of Atsushi's predicaments as being mistaken for a pervert.  She is very conscious of the fact that she's in danger of becoming an unmarried old maid.

A policewoman who constantly has to deal with Atsushi whenever he is mistaken for a pervert.
Aono

Another policewoman who knows of Atsushi's predicaments.  She is a chipper policewoman, but sometimes she goes overboard, usually to Miura's disadvantage.
Kawauchi-sensei

She is the trainee teacher in Atsushi's elementary school who is dismayed by Atsushi's immature behavior despite looking like the man of her dreams, forcing her to develop a hidden obsession for the boy.

A student at Atsumi's school who is an open lolicon and considers Atsumi to be a 'legal loli'.

Yoshioka's underclassman who is the other shortest (second shortest) student in his school besides Atsumi.

While the younger Yoshioka has a fetish for young girls, his older brother has a fetish for mature women, much to Miura's dismay.

A friend and classmate of Hina and Atsushi. She has dark brown hair that is worn in two wavy pigtails.

Another friend and classmate of Hina and Atsushi. She has purplish black hair that is styled in a bob cut.

Media

Manga
The original manga series by Meme Higashiya began serialization in Takeshobo's Manga Club Original and Manga Life Original from March 27, 2007. The series was added to the digital manga distribution website JManga on March 6, 2012.

Anime

An anime adaptation of Recorder and Randsell, separated into two seasons titled Do♪ and Re♪, aired on TV Saitama between January 5, 2012, and June 27, 2012. It was also simulcast by Crunchyroll. The series was released in two BD/DVD volumes on April 20, 2012, and July 20, 2012, respectively, featuring bonus episodes. A third season, Mi♪, began airing in July 2013. The ending theme for the first season is "Glitter" by Aoi Tada feat.

References

External links

Comedy anime and manga
Slice of life anime and manga
2007 manga
2012 anime television series debuts
Takeshobo manga
Seinen manga
Seven (animation studio)
Yonkoma